Mary Dee Vargas Ley (born 7 December 1996) is a Chilean judoka. She is a three-time medalist at the Pan American Judo Championships and a bronze medalist at the Pan American Games.

Career 

In 2017, she competed in the women's 48 kg event at the World Judo Championships held in Budapest, Hungary. She was eliminated from the competition in her first match by Milica Nikolić of Serbia.

At the 2019 Pan American Games held in Lima, Peru, she won one of the bronze medals in the women's 48 kg event.

In 2020, she won one of the bronze medals in the women's 48 kg event at the Pan American Judo Championships held in Guadalajara, Mexico. In January 2021, she competed in the women's 48 kg event at the 2021 Judo World Masters held in Doha, Qatar. In June 2021, she competed in the women's 48 kg event at the 2021 World Judo Championships held in Budapest, Hungary.

She represented Chile at the 2020 Summer Olympics in Tokyo, Japan. She competed in the women's 48 kg event where she was eliminated in her second match.

Achievements

References

External links 
 

Living people
1996 births
Place of birth missing (living people)
Chilean female judoka
South American Games bronze medalists for Chile
South American Games medalists in judo
Competitors at the 2018 South American Games
Pan American Games medalists in judo
Pan American Games bronze medalists for Chile
Judoka at the 2019 Pan American Games
Medalists at the 2019 Pan American Games
Judoka at the 2020 Summer Olympics
Olympic judoka of Chile
21st-century Chilean women